Us Against the World may refer to:

 Us Against the World (album) or the title song, by Play, 2001
 "Us Against the World" (Christina Milian song), 2008
 "Us Against the World" (Lana Del Ray song), 2010
 "Us Against the World" (Westlife song), 2008
 "Us Against the World", a song by Coldplay from Mylo Xyloto, 2011
 "Us Against the World", a song by Darren Styles from Monstercat Uncaged Vol. 1, 2017
 "Us Against the World", a song by Killswitch Engage from Atonement, 2019
 "Us Against the World", a song by Mitchel Musso from Mitchel Musso, 2009